The men's 100 metres at the 1969 European Athletics Championships was held in Athens, Greece, at Georgios Karaiskakis Stadium on 16 and 17 September 1969.

Medalists

Results

Final
17 September
Wind: -2.7 m/s

Semi-finals
16 September

Semi-final 1
Wind: -2.3 m/s

Semi-final 2
Wind: -3.1 m/s

Heats
16 September

Heat 1
Wind: -3.2 m/s

Heat 2
Wind: -3.3 m/s

Heat 3
Wind: -1.2 m/s

Heat 4
Wind: -4.5 m/s

Participation
According to an unofficial count, 28 athletes from 16 countries participated in the event.

 (1)
 (1)
 (3)
 (3)
 (1)
 (3)
 (1)
 (1)
 (1)
 (2)
 (3)
 (1)
 (2)
 (1)
 (3)
 (1)

References

100 metres
100 metres at the European Athletics Championships